Hella International is a yearly music event presented by Stones Throw Records at Miami's Winter Music Conference.

In 2009 Stones Throw released Hella International as a compilation album box-set containing three 12-inch vinyls. The album features many of the songs from Chrome Children Vol. 2 as well as some exclusive Madlib remixes of some J Dilla tracks. 

The Stones Throw Podcast has also featured sets by artists at Hella International, including Madlib (podcast #31), Karriem Riggins (#32), and Gaslamp Killer (#44).

Track listing

External links
  Hella International 2009
 Hella International 2007
 Stones Throw Records
 Stones Throw Podcast

Albums produced by Madlib
Albums produced by J Dilla
2009 compilation albums
Stones Throw Records compilation albums
Hip hop compilation albums